Grzegorz Jabłoński (born 10 March 1966) is a Polish boxer. He competed in the men's bantamweight event at the 1988 Summer Olympics. He lost his first bout to Nyamaagiin Altankhuyag of Mongolia.

References

External links
 Nyamaagiin Altankhuyag versus Grzegorz Jablonski 1988

1966 births
Living people
Polish male boxers
Olympic boxers of Poland
Boxers at the 1988 Summer Olympics
People from Ełk County
Sportspeople from Warmian-Masurian Voivodeship
Bantamweight boxers
20th-century Polish people
21st-century Polish people